A Flat Man is an album by Ivor Cutler.  Originally released in 1998 on Creation Records, it was re-released in 2008 by Hoorgi House Records, a label set up by Ivor Cutler's family after his death.

Track listing

References

Ivor Cutler albums
1998 albums
Creation Records albums